The Texas attorney general is the chief legal officer of the U.S. state of Texas. The current officeholder, Republican Ken Paxton, has served in the position since January 5, 2015.

Some of the office is housed at the William P. Clements State Office Building in Downtown Austin.

History

The Office of the Attorney General was first established by executive ordinance of the Republic of Texas government in 1836. The attorneys general of the Republic of Texas and the first four attorneys general under the 1845 state constitution were appointed by the governor. The office was made elective in 1850 by constitutional amendment.

The attorney general is elected to a four-year term. In 2013, former Attorney General Greg Abbott announced he would not seek reelection and would run for governor. In November 2014, he was elected as the governor of Texas. Ken Paxton defeated former House Representative Dan Branch in the Republican primary by a 26% margin and was elected easily in the general election as the 50th attorney general of Texas, (there is a historical dispute whether he is the 50th or 51st attorney general). Paxton was sworn in on January 5, 2015, in the Senate Chamber in the Texas Capitol. Governor Rick Perry, Lieutenant Governor David Dewhurst, United States Senator Ted Cruz, and Lieutenant Governor-Elect Dan Patrick all participated in the swearing-in ceremony.

Duties and responsibilities
The attorney general is charged by the state constitution to represent the state in civil litigation and approve public bond issues. There are nearly 2,000 references to the Office of the Attorney General in state laws.

The Office of the Attorney General serves as legal counsel to all boards and agencies of state government, issues legal opinions when requested by the governor, heads of state agencies and other officials and commissions, and defends challenges to state laws and suits against both state agencies and individual employees of the state. These duties include representing the Director of the Texas Department of Criminal Justice in appeals from criminal convictions in federal courts.

The Texas Constitution gives the attorney general no general law-enforcement powers; instead it limits the attorney general's authority in criminal cases to that dictated by statute. The Texas Legislature has not given the attorney general broad law-enforcement authority, but permits the attorney general to act in criminal cases at the request of prosecutors.

The Office of the Attorney General, Law Enforcement Division  conducts criminal investigations and apprehensions including cases involving cyber-crimes such as child pornography, online solicitation of minors, identity theft, election fraud, locating and apprehending convicted sex offenders who have failed to comply with mandated sex offender registration requirements, and conducting digital forensics investigations.  The Office of the Attorney General also operates the Medicaid Fraud Control Unit which investigates criminal fraud by Medicaid providers, abuse and neglect of patients in health care facilities operated by the Medicaid program, and helps local and federal authorities with prosecutions..

Its child support division is responsible for the establishment and enforcement of child support.

Officeholders

Political prominence
Many leading political figures in Texas history have served as attorney general, several of them using the office as a jumping-off place to other offices in the state and national government. Attorneys general James S. Hogg, Charles A. Culberson, Dan Moody, James V. Allred, Price Daniel, Mark White, and Greg Abbott were elected governor. Culberson, Daniel, and John Cornyn were later elected to the United States Senate.

Notes
 First elected attorney general (AG) of state of Texas; previously elected AG of the Republic of Texas
 Resigned
 Appointed

References

External links
 Texas Attorney General official website
 Texas Attorney General articles at ABA Journal
 News and Commentary at FindLaw
 U.S. Supreme Court Opinions – "Cases with title containing: State of Texas" at FindLaw
 State Bar of Texas
 Texas Attorney General Opinions, hosted by the Portal to Texas History

 
Attorney General, Texas